Autoridade Nacional de Comunicações (ANACOM) is Portugal's national regulatory authority for the communications sector, for the purposes of relevant Community and national legislation, including electronic communications and postal services. ANACOM also advises and assists the Portuguese Government in sector matters, while retaining its status as an independent administrative entity, with administrative, financial and management autonomy and its own assets.

ANACOM's main tasks are to promote competition in the provision of communications networks and services, ensure transparency in prices and in the conditions governing the use of services and provide efficient management of the radio spectrum. ANACOM is also responsible for supporting the development of markets and of electronic and postal communications networks, for protecting the rights and interests of citizens, and providing Portuguese representation at international bodies relevant to the sector.

ANACOM has its origins in Instituto das Comunicações de Portugal (ICP), which began its activity in 1989 and changed its name to ICP - Autoridade Nacional de Comunicações (ICP-ANACOM) in 2002. The current statutes of ANACOM entered into force in 2015, following approval of the Framework Law of Regulatory Bodies (Framework law for independent administrative entities with functions regulating the economic activity of the private, public and cooperative sector).

The Chair of ANACOM's Board of Directors is João Cadete de Matos (appointed in August 2017).

Prior Presidents

 Fernando Mendes
 Luís Nazaré
 Álvaro Dâmaso
 Pedro Duarte Neves
 José Manuel Amado da Silva
 Fátima Barros

External links
Official website

Communications authorities
Communications in Portugal
Regulators of Portugal
1989 establishments in Portugal
Organizations established in 1989